George Munro may refer to:
 George Munro, 5th Baron of Foulis, Scottish clan chief of the 13th century.
 George Munro, 10th Baron of Foulis (died 1452), Scottish clan chief.
 George Munro, 1st of Newmore (1602–1693), fought as a royalist for King Charles II of England, Scotland and Ireland.
 George Munro, 1st of Auchinbowie, fought as a royalist for King William III of England, Scotland and Ireland.
 George Munro, 1st of Culcairn (died 1746), fought as a royalist for King George I of Great Britain and George II of Great Britain.
 George Munro (philanthropist) (1825–1896), Canadian educator and philanthropist
 George Munro (publisher) (1864–1893), American magazine publisher whose editors include Mary Edwards Bryan
 George Campbell Munro (1866–1963), botanist and ornithologist, see Bishop's ʻōʻō

See also

 George Monro (disambiguation)